The 2018 Estoril Open (also known as the Millennium Estoril Open for sponsorship purposes) was a professional men's tennis tournament played on outdoor clay courts. It was the fourth edition of the Estoril Open, and part of the ATP World Tour 250 series of the 2018 ATP World Tour. The event took place at the Clube de Ténis do Estoril in Cascais, Portugal, from April 30 through May 6, 2018.

Singles main draw entrants

Seeds

 Rankings are as of April 23, 2018.

Other entrants
The following players received wildcards into the singles main draw:
  Alex de Minaur 
  Frederico Ferreira Silva 
  Pedro Sousa 

The following players received entry from the qualifying draw:
  Simone Bolelli 
  João Domingues
  Ricardo Ojeda Lara 
  Tim Smyczek

Withdrawals
Before the tournament
  David Ferrer → replaced by  Cameron Norrie
  Nick Kyrgios → replaced by  Nicolás Kicker
  Benoît Paire → replaced by  Gastão Elias

Doubles main draw entrants

Seeds

 Rankings are as of April 23, 2018.

Other entrants
The following pairs received wildcards into the doubles main draw:
  Alex de Minaur /  Lleyton Hewitt 
  Gastão Elias /  Pedro Sousa

Champions

Singles

  João Sousa def.  Frances Tiafoe, 6–4, 6–4

Doubles

  Kyle Edmund /  Cameron Norrie def.  Wesley Koolhof /  Artem Sitak, 6–4, 6–2

References

External links
 Official website